Mười: The Legend of a Portrait is a 2007 horror film starring Jo An, Cha Ye-ryun and Anh Thu. It became the first horror film in Vietnam after the Fall of Saigon as well as the first rated film in Vietnam.

Plot
Yun-hee, a South Korean writer, is under pressure by her editor to produce something of interest for her next book. She hasn’t had a book published in three years and is all too cognizant of this fact. Things look up when her old friend Seo-yeon calls from Vietnam. Seo-Yeon informs Yun-hee about a local Vietnamese folklore centered around a girl named “Mười” and her haunted portrait. It just so happens that in Yun-hee’s prior novel, she wrote a semi-autobiographical tale concerning her friends titled “Secrets & Lies”. In the book Seo-Yeon was portrayed in the most horrible manner, but Yun-hee is sure that Seo-Yeon hasn’t read the book as she has been living in Vietnam for years. Yun-hee eagerly flies to Vietnam to learn more about Muoi.

Vietnamese reaction
Muoi is considered the first horror film production to be made in Vietnam. Despite high public expectation, the picture also received bad reactions.

Upon examination, it received a disapproval from Vietnamese Bureau of Cinema for 
"unsuitable contents," which led to a delay in Vietnamese release. Because of this, it became the second horror film to be released in Vietnam, while another in the genre, Ngoi nha ma am/Suoi oan hon (Haunted House/Ghosted Stream), came out in August.

Finally, Muoi was released on December 24, 2007 with the first rating in Vietnamese film history: an under-16 ban for disturbing violence and horror image. Though stuck with this restriction, Muoi also had to suffer from scene cuts requested by the bureau. These include Muoi's right leg breakage, a monk's body falling, and So-hee's death.

Awards
At 2008's 7th Golden Kite Awards (the local equivalent of the Oscars), Phuoc Sang Films chose to send Muoi to the examining judge; afterwards, controversy arose because it was not considered a "real Vietnamese film" (most of the film was shot by Koreans). However, the film still received accolades for Best Cinematography and Best Sounds.

Cast
 Jo An ... Yoon-hee
 Cha Ye-ryun ... Seo-yeon
 Anh Thu ... Muoi
 Hong Anh ... Hong
 Hong So-hee ... Eun-jung
 Lim Seong-eon
 Ly Nha Ky ... young girl

See also
Ghosts in Vietnamese culture
Onryō
Japanese Urban Legends
The Amityville Horror (folk story)
The Grudge (film series)
Fatal Frame (video game)

References

External links 
 
 Muoi: The Legend of a Portrait at HanCinema
 Film review at Koreanfilm.org

2007 films
South Korean supernatural horror films
Vietnamese supernatural horror films
2000s Korean-language films
Vietnamese mythology in popular culture
Vietnamese-language films
2007 horror films
2000s South Korean films